Lemyra ypsilon is a moth of the family Erebidae. It was described by Walter Rothschild in 1910. It is found in Sundaland, Java, Borneo and Malaysia (Malacca). The habitat consists of lower montane forests and hill dipterocarp forests.

Adults have pale cream wings.

References

 

ypsilon
Moths described in 1910